is a Japanese cross-country skier.

At the 2011 Asian Winter Games he won silver medals in both the 4 x 10 kilometre relay and team sprint events.

He participated at the FIS Nordic World Ski Championships 2011 in Oslo.

References

External links
 Ski Association of Japan team member list 

1986 births
Living people
Japanese male cross-country skiers
Cross-country skiers at the 2011 Asian Winter Games
Asian Games medalists in cross-country skiing
Asian Games silver medalists for Japan
Medalists at the 2011 Asian Winter Games